Habib Dallagi (born 15 January 1941) is a Tunisian former sports shooter. He competed in the 50 metre rifle, prone event at the 1960 Summer Olympics.

References

1941 births
Living people
Tunisian male sport shooters
Olympic shooters of Tunisia
Shooters at the 1960 Summer Olympics
People from Sousse
20th-century Tunisian people